Lema Yemane (born 15 April 1951) is an Ethiopian boxer. He competed in the men's featherweight event at the 1972 Summer Olympics. At the 1972 Summer Olympics, he lost to Angelos Theotokatos of Greece.

References

1951 births
Living people
Ethiopian male boxers
Olympic boxers of Ethiopia
Boxers at the 1972 Summer Olympics
Place of birth missing (living people)
Featherweight boxers